Django Unchained is the soundtrack to Quentin Tarantino's motion picture Django Unchained. It was originally released on December 18, 2012. The soundtrack uses a variety of music genres, though with an especially heavy influence from Spaghetti Western soundtracks.

Tracks composed for the film are "100 Black Coffins" by Rick Ross and produced by and featuring Jamie Foxx, "Who Did That To You?" by John Legend, "Freedom" by Anthony Hamilton and Elayna Boynton, "Ancora Qui" by Ennio Morricone and Elisa. These four songs were all eligible for an Academy Award nomination in the Best Original Song category, but none of them were nominated.

The soundtrack also includes seven tracks that are dialogue excerpts from the film. It was nominated for a Grammy Award for Best Compilation Soundtrack for Visual Media.

Track listing

Film music not included on the album
 "Rito Finale" - Ennio Morricone
 "Norme Con Ironie" - Ennio Morricone
 "Town of Silence (2nd Version)" - Luis Bacalov
 "Gavotte" - Grace Collins
 "Town of Silence" - Luis Bacalov
 "Requiem and Prologue" - Masamichi Amano & Warsaw Philharmonic Orchestra
 "The Big Risk" - Ennio Morricone
 "Minacciosamente Lontano" - Ennio Morricone
 "Blue Dark Waltz" - Luis Bacalov
 "Für Elise" - Ashley Toman
 "Freedom (Motherless Child)" (edited from Woodstock: Music from the Original Soundtrack and More) - Richie Havens
 "Ain't No Grave (Black Opium Remix) "J2 and Steven Stern" - Johnny Cash
 "Dopo la congiura" - Ennio Morricone

Chart positions

Weekly charts

Year-end charts

Certifications

Singles
Individual tracks have been released as singles and charted on a number of official charts.

Personnel
Executive Music Producer: Quentin Tarantino
Music Supervisor: Mary Ramos
Soundtrack Producers: Stacey Sher, Reginald Hudlin, Pilar Savone, and Holly Adams
Label Soundtrack Producer: Tom Whalley

Critical reaction
Despite the fact that the soundtrack was acclaimed by critics,  Ennio Morricone, who composed a brand new song for Django Unchained, stated that Tarantino used the music “without coherence” and he "wouldn’t like to work with him again, on anything". That was the first collaboration between the Italian composer and the American filmmaker, even though Tarantino had used Morricone's music in Kill Bill, Death Proof, and Inglourious Basterds. Ennio Morricone quickly released a statement clarifying that his remarks were taken out of context,  Morricone said that he has "great respect for Tarantino" and that he is "glad he chooses my music" Morricone also said that because Tarantino chooses his music "it is a sign of artistic brotherhood" Morricone went on to compose the score to Tarantino's next film, The Hateful Eight.

In a scholarly essay on the film's music, Hollis Robbins notes that the vast majority of film music borrowings come from films made between 1966 and 1974 and argues that the political and musical resonances of these allusions situate Django Unchained squarely in the Vietnam and Watergate era, during the rise and decline of Black Power cinema.

References

External links
Official soundtrack website

Universal Republic Records soundtracks
2012 soundtrack albums